The United States Ambassador to Seychelles is the official representative of the government of the United States to the government of Seychelles. The ambassador is concurrently the ambassador to Mauritius, while resident in Port Louis, Mauritius.

Ambassadors

1 April 1976 - 26 April 1977 Anthony D. Marshall (Resident at Nairobi; Consulate established April 1, 1976)
19 July 1977 - 28 June 1980 Wilbert J. LeMelle (Resident at Nairobi)
26 August 1980 - 22 September 1983 William Harrop (Resident at Nairobi)
2 November 1983 - 9 June 1985 David Joseph Fischer
23 August 1985 - 8 July 1987 Irvin Hicks
15 December 1987 - 31 August 1991 James B. Moran
1 October 1991 - 5 July 1992 Richard W. Carlson
22 September 1992 - 1 March 1993 Mack F. Mattingly
1 March 1993 - 7 September 1994 F. Stephen Malott (Chargé d'affaires)
7 September 1994 - 12 May 1995 Carl B. Stokes
12 May 1995 - 29 August 1996 Brent E. Blaschke (Chargé d'affaires)
29 August 1996 - 27 May 1999 Harold W. Geisel (Resident at Mauritius)
14 September 1999 - 4 March 2001 Mark Wylea Erwin (Resident at Mauritius)
17 July 2002 - 22 June 2005 John Price (Resident at Mauritius)
2 October 2006 - 14 October 2009 Cesar B. Cabrera (Resident at Mauritius)
18 February 2010 - 26 February 2011 Mary Jo Wills (Resident at Mauritius)
5 November 2012 - 20 January 2017 Shari Villarosa (Resident at Mauritius)
13 December 2017 - 15 January 2021 David Dale Reimer (Resident at Mauritius)
23 February 2023 - Present Henry V. Jardine (Resident at Mauritius)

See also
Seychelles – United States relations
Foreign relations of Seychelles
Ambassadors of the United States

References
United States Department of State: Background notes on Seychelles

External links
 United States Department of State: Chiefs of Mission for the Seychelles
 United States Department of State: Seychelles
 United States Embassy in Port Louis

Seychelles

United States